Kuka may refer to:

Pavel Kuka (b. 1968), former Czech association football player
KUKA, a German-based manufacturer of industrial robots
KUKA (FM), a radio station licensed to Driscoll, Texas, United States
Kuka, the Namdhari sect of Sikhism
Kuka people, an ethnic group in Chad
Kuka (Višegrad), a village in Bosnia and Herzegovina
Kuka, Punjab, a village in Punjab, India
Kuka, Russia, several rural localities in Chitinsky District of Zabaykalsky Krai, Russia
Kuka, former name of Kukawa, a town in Borno State, Nigeria